George Henry Dumont ["Pea Soup"] (November 13, 1895 – October 13, 1956) was a pitcher in Major League Baseball who played from 1915 through 1919 for the Washington Senators (1915–1918) and Boston Red Sox (1919). He was born in Minneapolis, Minnesota.
 
In a five-season career, Dumont posted a 10–23 record with 128 strikeouts and a 2.85 ERA in 77 appearances, including 35 starts, 14 complete games, four shutouts, three saves, and 347 innings pitched.

Dumont died in his home of Minneapolis, Minnesota, at the age of 60.

External links

Boston Red Sox players
Washington Senators (1901–1960) players
Major League Baseball pitchers
Baseball players from Minneapolis
1895 births
1956 deaths
Fargo-Moorhead Graingrowers players
Minneapolis Millers (baseball) players
Atlanta Crackers players
Little Rock Travelers players
Dallas Steers players
Omaha Packers players